Kidder Motor Vehicle Company was a veteran era automobile manufacturer started in 1899 in New Haven, Connecticut.

History 
Inventor Wellington P. Kidder experimented with steam cars and established the Kidder Motor Vehicle Company in New Haven to produce them.

Kidder Model 2 was a $1,000 runabout and Model B was a $1,600 delivery wagon. The twin cylinders of its motor were placed on each side of the boiler at the back of the vehicle with direct drive to the rear axle.

In 1903 the company voted to discontinue it's corporate existence.

References

See also 
Steam Automobile

Kidder Motor Vehicle Co
Veteran vehicles
Defunct motor vehicle manufacturers of the United States
Steam cars
1900s cars
Cars introduced in 1899
Motor vehicle manufacturers based in Connecticut
Vehicle manufacturing companies disestablished in 1903
Vehicle manufacturing companies established in 1899